Hrib is a small village in the Municipality of Črnomelj in southeastern Slovenia. From 1952 until 2000, the area was part of the settlement of Breg pri Sinjem Vrhu. The village is part of the traditional region of White Carniola and is included in the Southeast Slovenia Statistical Region.

References

External links
Hrib on Geopedia

Populated places in the Municipality of Črnomelj
Populated places established in 2000
2000 establishments in Slovenia